The Avenue of Stars, modelled on the Hollywood Walk of Fame, is an avenue located along the Victoria Harbour waterfront in Tsim Sha Tsui, Hong Kong. It honours celebrities of the Hong Kong film industry.

History

Establishment 
In 1982, the New World Group built a promenade along the waterfront around the New World Centre in Tsim Sha Tsui East, Kowloon. In 2004, the Group announced it would spend HK$40 million to build the Avenue of Stars, a project supported by the Hong Kong Tourism Board, [|Tourism Commission]], the Leisure and Cultural Services Department of the Hong Kong Government and the Hong Kong Film Awards Association.

The avenue was opened to the general public on 28 April 2004 with an opening ceremony held the previous day, 27 April 2004. The opening ceremony was presided over by a number of government and industry figures, including Henry Tang (Financial Secretary), Stephen Ip (Secretary for Economic Development and Labour), Patrick Ho (Secretary of Home Affairs), Selina Chow (Chair of Hong Kong Tourism Board), Manfred Wong (Director/Actor), and Cheng Yu-tung (Chair of New World Group); in which the privately funded avenue was handed over to the Hong Kong SAR government as public property. At opening, the avenue honoured an initial 73 inductees elected by the Hong Kong Film Awards Association and the readers of City Entertainment.

Redevelopment controversy

After having managed the avenue for 11 years, its contract is due to expire. It was announced in August 2015 that the Leisure and Cultural Services Department of the Hong Kong government would redevelop and expand the avenue jointly with the company. The Hong Kong government declared that the enhancement project would contain limited commercial appeal, and no luxury shops or high-end restaurants would be added. The walkway, very popular with tourists, is to be closed off and relocated to the Tsim Sha Tsui East Waterfront Podium Garden temporarily for three years while the expansion is undertaken.

The decision to award the contract for the redevelopment to the company without putting it out to tender, on the justification that the project was non-profit, sparked controversy locally. Residents' groups and other development companies owning properties adjacent to the walk expressed discontent, whilst the LCSD claimed that consultations with the local district council had been favourable. In an apparent attempt to de-fuse the public furore at the apparent collusion between government and big business, the government promised a public consultation.

Renovation 
On 31 January 2019, the Avenue was reopened to the public after three years of renovation, redesigned by New York High Line architect James Corner Field Operations (JCFO) together with other international and local designers.

Description

The Avenue of Stars is the eastern node of several tourist attractions along the Tsim Sha Tsui waterfront. In addition to the promenade and New World Centre, a number of attractions exist including the Museum of Art, Space Museum, Cultural Centre and the Clock Tower.

Entering from Salisbury Garden, a 4.5-metre-tall replica of the statuette given to winners at the Hong Kong Film Awards greets visitors. Along the 440-metre promenade, the story of Hong Kong's one hundred years of cinematic history is told through inscriptions printed on nine red pillars. Set into the promenade are plaques honouring the celebrities. Some plaques contain hand prints and autographs of the stars set in cement, but most of the plaques only contain celebrities' names as they are now deceased. A 2.5-metre bronze statue of Bruce Lee was erected along the Avenue of Stars in 2005. In 2014, a bronze statue of Anita Mui was erected along the Avenue of Stars.

The promenade commands a  panoramic view across Victoria Harbour. At night, it is a popular viewing place for the Symphony of Lights display.

A large replica of the 2008 Summer Olympics torch will be on permanent display here.

List of stars
The following people have received plaques on the avenue of stars.
Note: People in the list who were born before 1949 in the Republic of China are not from modern day Taiwan, but from mainland China, which the Republic of China encompassed until the end of the last civil war.

See also 

 Statue of McDull
 Tsim Sha Tsui Waterfront Revitalisation Plan
 Avenue of Stars, London
 Hollywood Walk of Fame, Los Angeles
 Canada's Walk of Fame, Toronto
 Paseo de las Luminarias, Mexico City
 Hong Kong Avenue of Comic Stars

References

External links 

 
 Photos of The Avenue of Stars

Culture of Hong Kong
Entertainment halls of fame
Landmarks in Hong Kong
Tourist attractions in Hong Kong
Tsim Sha Tsui
Hong Kong, Avenue of Stars